Broad Ripple Firehouse–Indianapolis Fire Department Station 32 is a historic fire station located in Indianapolis, Indiana.  It was built in 1922, and is a -story, cross plan, Tudor Revival style brown brick building.  It features a jerkinhead roof with deep overhanging eaves and a double peak, half-timbered gable.  An addition was constructed in 1980.

It was listed on the National Register of Historic Places in 2011.

References

External links

Fire stations on the National Register of Historic Places in Indiana
Tudor Revival architecture in Indiana
Government buildings completed in 1922
Buildings and structures in Indianapolis
National Register of Historic Places in Indianapolis